Palace Hotel, also known as M.S. Cowles & Co., American Clothing House, Ross Hotel, and J.C. Penney Co., is a historic hotel and commercial building located at Butler, Bates County, Missouri. It was built in 1879, and is a three-story, rectangular, Italianate style wood-frame building faced in brick. It features a highly ornamented front facade, including elaborated window crowns in an inverted-U shape.

It was listed on the National Register of Historic Places in 2002.

References

Hotel buildings on the National Register of Historic Places in Missouri
Commercial buildings on the National Register of Historic Places in Missouri
Italianate architecture in Missouri
Hotel buildings completed in 1879
Buildings and structures in Bates County, Missouri
National Register of Historic Places in Bates County, Missouri